Bel'kopa, also known as Belkopa, (Belqopa, بەلقوپا; , Belkopa) is a town in Aktobe Region, west Kazakhstan.

References

Aktobe Region
Cities and towns in Kazakhstan